Zebinella is a genus of minute sea snails, marine gastropod mollusks or micromollusks, in the family Rissoinidae.

Species
Species within the genus Zebinella include:
 † Zebinella abbotti (Ladd, 1866) 
 Zebinella alarconi (Hertlein & Strong, 1951)
 Zebinella albida (C. B. Adams, 1845)
 Zebinella allemani (Bartsch, 1931)
  † Zebinella ame (Woodring, 1928)
 Zebinella angulata (Laseron, 1956) 
 Zebinella azaniensis (Cox, 1927)
 Zebinella barthelowi (Bartsch, 1915) 
 † Zebinella brandenburgi (Boettger, 1896) 
 Zebinella concinna (Laseron, 1956) 
 Zebinella cylindrica (Preston, 1908)
 Zebinella decussata (Montagu, 1803)
 Zebinella elegantula (Angas, 1880) 
 † Zebinella eleonorae (Boettger, 1901) 
 Zebinella evanida (G. Nevill & H. Nevill, 1881)
 Zebinella guadeloupensis Faber & Moolenbeek, 2013
 Zebinella herosae Faber, 2015 
 † Zebinella heterolira (Laws, 1941)  
 Zebinella janus (C. B. Adams, 1852)
 † Zebinella liriope (Olsson & Harbison, 1953) 
 † Zebinella mijana (Ladd, 1866)
 †  Zebinella mimbastaensis (Lozouet, 2011) 
 †  Zebinella minuta (Gabb, 1873) 
 Zebinella moellendorffi (Boettger, 1893)
 † Zebinella oligopleura (Woodring, 1928) 
 † Zebinella oyamai Itoigawa & Nishimoto, 1984 
 Zebinella paumotuensis (Couturier, 1907) 
 Zebinella princeps (C. B. Adams, 1850)
 Zebinella punctifera Faber, 2015 
 † Zebinella sororcula (Boettger, 1901)
 Zebinella striatocostata (d’Orbigny, 1842)
 Zebinella striosa (C. B. Adams, 1850)
 Zebinella tenuistriata (Pease, 1868)
 Zebinella townsendi (Bartsch, 1915)
 † Zebinella varicosa (Boettger, 1906)
 Zebinella vitiensis Faber, 2015 
 † Zebinella vredenburgi (Dey, 1962)
 Zebinella zeltneri (de Folin, 1867)
Species brought into synonymy
 Zebinella affinis (C. B. Adams, 1845): synonym of Zebinella striatocostata (d'Orbigny, 1842)
 Zebinella affinis (Garrett, 1873): synonym of Zebinella tenuistriata (Pease, 1868)

References

 Ponder W. F. (1985) A review of the genera of the Rissoidae (Mollusca: Mesogastropoda: Rissoacea). Records of the Australian Museum supplement 4: 1-221
 Faber M.J. & Moolenbeek R.G. (2013) Two new species of Rissoinidae from Guadeloupe (Gastropoda: Rissooidea). Miscellanea Malacologica 6(1): 9-14.

 
Rissoinidae